Kafr Zita Subdistrict  is a Syrian nahiyah (subdistrict) located in Mhardeh District in Hama.  According to the Syria Central Bureau of Statistics (CBS), Kafr Zita Subdistrict had a population of 39,302 in the 2004 census.

References 

Kafr Zita
Mahardah District